The Australian rugby league premiers are the winners of the top grade competition in Australian rugby league, which is currently the National Rugby League. From 1908 until 1994, when the ARL Premiership was formed, there were two premiers, one each from Sydney and Brisbane. This occurred again in 1997 during the Super League war.

History

From 1905 the states of Queensland and New South Wales were beginning to create Rugby League competitions, using the rules created in Northern England as a break-away game from Rugby Union.

The first season of rugby league in Australia commenced in New South Wales and was held in 1908 and was run by the New South Wales Rugby Football League. Queensland Rugby League was established in 1908 also; they ran their inaugural senior season in 1909. Both states ran parallel state competitions from that time. The game was adopted in both states in order to break away from the amateur rugby union competitions that existed at the time. The players had fallen out of heart with the administration of that game due to increased revenue from the game not being reflected in player allotments. At the end of the 1908 NSW season, South Sydney became the first team to win the New South Wales premiership. The Fortitude Valley Diehards, then known as Valleys, won the inaugural senior Queensland Rugby league season in 1909. 

The New South Wales Rugby League and Brisbane Rugby League competitions ran parallel to each other for nearly the entire 20th century, with interstate competitions held annually. However, due to these competitions being mainly between state representative sides, apart from a few NSWRL premier v BRL premier competitions held in the 1920s, there was often no way to determine a national premier. 

After 19 years of interstate-era dominance by New South Wales, the advent of State of Origin football in 1980 led to increased nationalisation of rugby league in Australia. After a failed proposal to play the first ever "National Championship" game in 1984 between the highly fancied BRL premier Wynnum-Manly Seagulls and the Canterbury-Bankstown Bulldogs of the NSWRL, it was decided that the Queensland Rugby League should form a team in 1986 to enter the NSWRL premiership. While the QRL slowly looked to create their own team, a private bid from the Brisbane Broncos consortium won the licence and the team entered the NSWRL in 1988. As a result, the standard of the Brisbane Rugby League decreased, and no BRL player was picked to represent Queensland or Australia afterwards; at this point most historians agree that the NSWRL became the premier competition nationwide.

Although the BRL was also a first-class competition, similar to Australian Rules Football, where the Australian Football League which evolved from the Victorian Football League keeps VFL statistics back to 1897 as its own history but considers South Australia's SANFL and Western Australia's WAFL as separate competitions, the National Rugby League counts the history of the NSWRL Premiership as its own but considers the Brisbane Rugby League separate. Therefore BRL champions are considered Australian Rugby League premiers but are not NRL premiers.

Starting from 1995, the New South Wales competition began to call itself the Australian Rugby League. In 1997, an actual national competition was created by News Limited known as Super League, this was formed and run alongside the New South Wales and Queensland state premierships, a number of New South Wales competition teams being promoted to it. Later that year, an agreement was made between Super League and the New South Wales competition, following massive financial loss to both parties, to merge into a new National competition, known as the National Rugby League.

South Sydney, with 20 New South Wales State titles, have been crowned New South Wales premiers more times than any other team. Fortitude Valley Diehards won the Queensland competition 23 times during its period as a first class competition, giving them the most first-class titles in Australian rugby league. They are followed by St. George with 15 premierships, including a record 11 New South Wales premierships in a row between 1956 and 1966. At the opposite end of the spectrum, the Cronulla-Sutherland Sharks took nearly 50 years to win their maiden premiership in 2016 - longer than any other club in the history of the game (Parramatta's maiden premiership came in its 35th season in 1981).

There are 2 clubs currently playing in the National Rugby League that are yet to win a premiership; New Zealand Warriors and Gold Coast Titans.

Since 1908, counting the NRL and some of its predecessors (including the 1997 Super League Season), the following sides are a few who have never won a premiership:

 Newcastle Rebels
 Cumberland RLFC
 Glebe Dirty Reds
 Annandale Dales
 University Students
 Illawarra Steelers
 Gold Coast Giants / Seagulls / Chargers
 New Zealand Warriors
 Western Reds
 South Queensland Crushers
 Adelaide Rams
 Hunter Mariners
 Northern Eagles
 Gold Coast Titans
All BRL teams except the Ipswich Jets and Logan Scorpions won a premiership during its time as a top level competition.

List of Premierships

List of NSWRL/ARL/SL/NRL Premiers (1908-present) 

 1 The Melbourne Storm were stripped of these titles due to gross long-term salary cap breaches. They also received 0 points in 2010 due to these breaches.

Premiership performances by team  
- *Denotes no grand final played

Regular season team performance

Other first-grade competitions

List of QRL/BRL premiers (1909–1994)
Note: The BRL maintained first class status until 1994 when the NSWRL became the ARL and a national competition was formed.

See also 

 List of NRL Grand finals
 List of British rugby league champions

References

External links

 A History of Brisbane Rugby League (1909-2017)

National Rugby League
Rugby league in Australia
Australian rugby league lists
National Rugby League lists
rugby league